Mumbai City Football Club is an Indian professional football club based in Mumbai, Maharashtra that competes in the Indian Super League, the top flight of Indian football. The club was founded in August 2014, during the inaugural season of the Indian Super League (ISL). Mumbai City is the first club to win both the ISL title and League Winners Shield, which it did in the 2020–21 season. Also, Mumbai City is the first club from India to win an AFC Champions League group stage match.

Key
Key to league competitions:

 Indian Super League – Rebranded India's Top Tier Football League, Established In 2014

Key to colours and symbols:

Key to league record:
 Season = The year and article of the season
 Finals = Final position
 P = Games played
 W = Games won
 D = Games drawn
 L = Games lost
 GF = Goals for
 GA = Goals against
 Pts = Points

Key to cup record:
 En-dash (–) = The Islanders did not participate or cup not held
 GS =Group Stage
 R32 = Round of 32
 R16 = Round of 16
 QF = Quarter-finals
 SF = Semi-finals
 RU = Runners-up
 W = Winners

Seasons
The Islanders started to play in the Indian Super League from its inception in 2014. They were one of the eight founding teams of the league. From 2017-18 season onwards, two more teams were added into the league. The Super Cup did not exist for the first three seasons until it was introduced in 2017. In 2020, one more club joined the league.

In August 2022, the Islanders announced their participation in Durand Cup, which is the oldest existing football tournament in Asia and 3rd oldest existing professional club football tournament in the world.

Correct as the end of the 2021–22 season.

See also 
Mumbai City FC
Mumbai City FC Reserves and Academy
List of Mumbai City FC records and statistics
List of Mumbai City FC players

References

External links